ACF Industries, originally the American Car and Foundry Company (abbreviated as ACF), is an American manufacturer of railroad rolling stock. One of its subsidiaries was once (1925–54) a manufacturer of motor coaches and trolley coaches under the brand names of (first) ACF and (later) ACF-Brill. Today, the company is known as ACF Industries LLC and is based in St. Charles, Missouri. It is owned by investor Carl Icahn.

History
The American Car and Foundry Company was originally formed and incorporated in New Jersey in 1899 as a result of the merger of thirteen smaller railroad car manufacturers. The company was made up of:

Later in 1899, ACF acquired the Bloomsburg Car Manufacturing Company of Bloomsburg, Pennsylvania. Orders for new freight cars were made very quickly, with several hundred cars ordered in the first year alone. Two years later, ACF acquired the Jackson and Sharp Company (founded 1863 in Wilmington, Delaware) and the Common Sense Bolster Company (of Chicago, Illinois). The unified company made a large investment in the former Jackson & Woodin plant in Pennsylvania, spending about $3 million. It was at this plant that ACF built the first all-steel passenger car in the world in 1904. The car was built for the Interborough Rapid Transit system of New York City, the first of 300 such cars ordered by that system.

In 1903, the company was operating overseas in Trafford Park, Manchester, U.K., and it was featured on a Triumphal Arch built for the Royal Visit of King Edward VII and Queen Alexandra in 1903. The factory buildings were later used by Ford cars, which began manufacturing at Trafford Park in 1911.

1904 and 1905 saw ACF build several motor cars and trailers for the London Underground. In those two years, ACF also acquired the Southern Car and Foundry (founded 1899 in Memphis, Tennessee), Indianapolis Car and Foundry, and Indianapolis Car Company.

In 1916, William H. Woodin, formerly president of Jackson and Woodin Manufacturing Company, was promoted to become president of ACF.  Woodin would later become Secretary of the Treasury under U.S. President Franklin Roosevelt.

During World War I, ACF produced artillery gun mounts and ammunition, submarine chasers and other boats, railway cars, and other equipment to support the Allies. ACF ranked 36th among United States corporations in the value of World War II production contracts.

Timeline
 1899: American Car and Foundry (ACF) is formed from the merger of 13 smaller companies
 1899: ACF acquires Bloomsburg Car Manufacturing Company
 1901: ACF acquires Jackson and Sharp Company and Common Sense Bolster Company
 1904: ACF builds the first all-steel passenger car in the world for the Interborough Rapid Transit
 1904: ACF acquires Southern Car and Foundry of Memphis, Tennessee
 1905: ACF acquires Indianapolis Car and Foundry and Indianapolis Car Company
 1922: ACF diversifies into the automotive industry with the acquisition of Carter Carburetor Corporation
 March 31, 1924: ACF acquires Pacific Car and Foundry from William Pigott
 October 31, 1925: ACF forms "American Car and Foundry Securities Corporation" (A wholly owned subsidiary holding company) for the purpose of acquiring Fageol Motors Company of Ohio and Hall-Scott Motor Car Company Fageol Motors Company of California was included but was not approved by the shareholders.
 1926: ACF acquires J. G. Brill Company
 1926: ACF acquires American Motor Body Corporation
 1927: ACF acquires Shippers Car Line
 1934: Paul Pigott reinstates a controlling interest of Pacific Car and Foundry
 1935: ACF builds lightweight Rebel streamline trains for the Gulf, Mobile and Northern Railroad
 1939: ACF's Berwick plant switches to construction of military tanks.
 1940: Brill is fully merged into ACF.
 August 2, 1941: ACF's 1,000th military tank is completed for the United States military effort of World War II
 1954: The company officially changes its name to ACF Industries, Incorporated.
 1954: ACF purchases Engineering and Research Corporation.
 1954–1955: ACF delivers 35 "Astra Dome" dome cars to the Union Pacific Railroad.
 January 1961: ACF delivers its last passenger car, (NYCT IRT R28. IRT car), Berwick plant closed, sold, to later re-open as Berwick Forge & Fabricating Corporation.
 1977: Southern Pacific Railroad (SP) came up with the idea of the first double-stack intermodal car in 1977. SP then designed the first car with ACF Industries that same year.
 1984: ACF is purchased by Carl Icahn.
 1997: ACF reaches a leasing agreement with GE Capital Railcar for 35,000 of its 46,000 railcars, mostly on 16-year leases with optional purchase agreements.
 2003: ACF Industries LLC became a successor to ACF Industries, Incorporated on May 1, 2003.

Products

In the past, ACF built passenger and freight cars, including covered hopper cars for hauling such cargo as corn and other grains. One of the largest customers was the Union Pacific Railroad, whose armour-yellow carbon-steel lightweight passenger rolling stock was mostly built by ACF. The famous dome-observation car "Native Son" was an ACF product.

Another important ACF railroad production were the passenger cars of the Missouri River "Eagle", a Missouri Pacific streamliner put in service in March 1940. This train, in its original shape, consisted of six cars including one baggage, one baggage-mail, two coaches one food and beverage car and finally the observation lounge-parlor car. All the passenger equipment was styled by industrial designer Raymond Loewy.

Today, the U.S. passenger car market is erratic in production and is mostly handled by specialty manufacturers and foreign corporations. Competitors Budd, Pullman-Standard, Rohr Industries, and the St. Louis Car Company have all either left the market or gone out of business.

The manufacturing facility in Milton, Pennsylvania, is served by the Norfolk Southern Railway and is capable of manufacturing railcars and all related railcar components. The plant is capable of producing pressure vessels in sizes 18,000–61,000 gwc, including propane tanks, compressed gas storage, LPG storage, and all related components, including heads. The plant, covering 48 acres, provides 500,000 square feet of covered work area and seven miles of storage tracks. The Huntington, West Virginia, production site ceased production in late 2009. The site continues only as a repair facility.

See also
 American Car Company
 Canadian Car and Foundry
 List of rolling stock manufacturers

References

External links

 ACF Industries website
 ACF Industries Archival Collection – University of Missouri
 History of ACF trucks – Trucksplanet
 American Car and Foundry Company – World War II era photographs at the Hagley Library

 
Rolling stock manufacturers of the United States
Defunct bus manufacturers of the United States
Defunct manufacturing companies based in Missouri
St. Charles County, Missouri
American companies established in 1899
Manufacturing companies established in 1899
Vehicle manufacturing companies established in 1899
1899 establishments in New Jersey
Former components of the Dow Jones Industrial Average